Balkrishan Gopiram Goenka (born 15 August 1966) is an Indian businessman based in Mumbai, Maharashtra, India. He is the Chairman of the US$2.3 billion Welspun Group, a global conglomerate with operations in more than 50 countries.

He is the co-founder and largest shareholder of companies such as Welspun India Ltd, the world's largest manufacturer of terry towels, and Welspun Corp Ltd, the world's second-largest producer of large-diameter pipes.

As Associated Chambers of Commerce and Industry of India (ASSOCHAM) President (2018-2019), Goenka contributed significantly to shaping India's Trade, Commerce, and Industrial environment.

According to Forbes, Goenka's net worth is estimated at $1.3 billion as of 29 December 2022. Goenka ranked 83rd on 2015's Forbes India Rich List.

Early life
Balkrishan Goenka (known more as BK or BKG) was born on 15 August 1966 in Hisar, Haryana, the son of Gopi Ram Goenka and his wife, Gayatri Devi Goenka. The second of three children, he grew up in Delhi before moving to Mumbai in the early 1980s. Balkrishan Goenka lived in a joint family in a large house with grandparents, parents, brothers and sisters, four uncles, aunts, and cousins.

He came from a Marwari family engaged in exporting food grains but seemed interested in something other than carrying on the family business. Goenka wanted to venture into a different business. The 16-year-old BKG decided to turn the family's movie hall into a commercial complex and set up a fast food joint there.

Career
The career of BKG has been majorly influenced by Gopi Ram Goenka (Babuji). Balkrishan Goenka draws inspiration from his father. Goenka founded Welspun in 1985. The initial project was in Maharashtra's Palghar. Canara Bank provided the funding, and Himsons, Surat, a company that assembles texturizing machinery, was contracted to supply the first machine. Within a year, the company made a profit of INR 18 lakhs.

Goenka set up Welspun with his cousin, Rajesh R. Mandawewala, now the managing director of the Welspun Group. Over 25 years, he built up a $3-billion turnover company.

Timeline

2000s–present 
In 2006, Welspun acquired an 85 percent stake in CHT Holdings Limited, the holding company of Christy, the leading towel brand in Britain. BKG has ventured into various businesses ranging from home textiles to steel pipes, infrastructure, renewable business, warehousing and Oil & Gas.

Personal life 
He married Dipali Goenka in 1987, and they have two daughters, Radhika and Vanshika. He owns two vintage cars: A Standard Coventry 1929 and a 1930 Ford.

References

Living people
Businesspeople from Rajasthan
1966 births
Indian businesspeople in textiles